Pankow is the most populous and the second-largest borough by area of Berlin. In Berlin's 2001 administrative reform, it was merged with the former boroughs of Prenzlauer Berg and Weißensee; the resulting borough retained the name Pankow. Pankow was sometimes claimed by the Western Allies (United States, United Kingdom, and France) to be the capital of the German Democratic Republic (East Germany), while the German Democratic Republic itself considered East Berlin to be its capital.

Overview
The borough, named after the Panke river, covers the northeast of the city region, including the inner city locality of Prenzlauer Berg. It borders Mitte and Reinickendorf in the west, Friedrichshain-Kreuzberg in the south, and Lichtenberg in the east. Pankow is Berlin's largest borough by population and the second largest by area (after Treptow-Köpenick).

Between 1945 and 1960, Schönhausen Palace and the nearby Majakowskiring street in the Niederschönhausen locality of Pankow was the home to many members of the East German government. Western writers therefore often referred to Pankow as a metonym for the East German regime—as reflected by Udo Lindenberg's song Sonderzug nach Pankow.

The Rykestrasse Synagogue, Germany's largest synagogue, is located in the Prenzlauer Berg locality. The Weißensee Cemetery is one of the largest Jewish cemeteries in Europe. In northern Prenzlauer Berg, the Wohnstadt ("residential town") Carl Legien is part of the Berlin Modernist Housing Estates UNESCO World Heritage Site. The Weißer See is the borough's largest natural body of water.

Subdivision

The Pankow borough consists of 13 localities:

Politics

District council
The governing body of Pankow is the district council (Bezirksverordnetenversammlung). It has responsibility for passing laws and electing the city government, including the mayor. The most recent district council election was held on 26 September 2021, and the results were as follows: 

! colspan=2| Party
! Lead candidate
! Votes
! %
! +/-
! Seats
! +/-
|-
| bgcolor=| 
| align=left| Alliance 90/The Greens (Grüne)
| align=left| Cordelia Koch
| 56,349
| 24.7
|  4.1
| 16
|  4
|-
| bgcolor=| 
| align=left| The Left (LINKE)
| align=left| Sören Benn
| 44,351
| 19.4
|  1.6
| 12
|  1
|-
| bgcolor=| 
| align=left| Social Democratic Party (SPD)
| align=left| Rona Tietje
| 38,984
| 18.1
|  3.0
| 11
|  1
|-
| bgcolor=| 
| align=left| Christian Democratic Union (CDU)
| align=left| Denise Bittner
| 28,165
| 12.3
|  0.4
| 8
| ±0
|-
| bgcolor=| 
| align=left| Alternative for Germany (AfD)
| align=left| Daniel Krüger
| 17,822
| 7.8
|  5.5
| 5
|  3
|-
| bgcolor=| 
| align=left| Free Democratic Party (FDP)
| align=left| Thomas Enge
| 13,241
| 5.8
|  1.9
| 3
|  1
|-
| colspan=8 bgcolor=lightgrey|
|-
| bgcolor=| 
| align=left| Tierschutzpartei
| align=left| 
| 6,053
| 2.7
| New
| 0
| New
|-
| bgcolor=| 
| align=left| Die PARTEI
| align=left| 
| 5,310
| 2.3
|  0.3
| 0
| ±0
|-
| bgcolor=| 
| align=left| dieBasis
| align=left| 
| 4,236
| 1.9
| New
| 0
| New
|-
| bgcolor=| 
| align=left| Volt Germany
| align=left| 
| 3,980
| 1.7
| New
| 0
| New
|-
| 
| align=left| The Greys
| align=left| 
| 3,429
| 1.5
| New
| 0
| New
|-
| bgcolor=| 
| align=left| Free Voters
| align=left| 
| 2,315
| 1.0
| New
| 0
| New
|-
| bgcolor=| 
| align=left| Klimaliste
| align=left| 
| 1,885
| 0.8
| New
| 0
| New
|-
| 
| align=left| Renters' Party
| align=left| 
| 1,523
| 0.7
|  0.9
| 0
| ±0
|-
| bgcolor=| 
| align=left| Ecological Democratic Party
| align=left| 
| 459
| 0.2
| New
| 0
| New
|-
! colspan=3| Valid votes
! 228,102
! 99.3
! 
! 
! 
|-
! colspan=3| Invalid votes
! 1,561
! 0.7
! 
! 
! 
|-
! colspan=3| Total
! 229,663
! 100.0
! 
! 55
! ±0
|-
! colspan=3| Electorate/voter turnout
! 310,049
! 74.1
!  7.3
! 
! 
|-
| colspan=8| Source: Elections Berlin
|}

District government
The district mayor (Bezirksbürgermeister) is elected by the Bezirksverordnetenversammlung, and positions in the district government (Bezirksamt) are apportioned based on party strength. Sören Benn of The Left was elected mayor on 27 October 2016. Since the 2021 municipal elections, the composition of the district government is as follows:

Transportation

Motorised transportation
Pankow's road network is characterised by three radial axes to and from the city centre at Alexanderplatz - all of them running in a north/north-eastern direction: B96a (Schönhauser Allee/Berliner Straße), B109 (Prenzlauer Allee/Prenzlauer Promenade) and B2 (Greifswalder Straße/Berliner Allee). B109 leads to A114; Pankow is also the only borough in Berlin which is directly served by the Berliner Ring A10.

The ring roads of Danziger Straße (within the Berlin S-Bahn circle line) and Ostseestraße - Wisbyer Straße - Bornholmer Straße also of high importance.

Public transportation
Pankow is served by the S-Bahn lines S1, S2, S25, S26, S41, S42, S8 and S85. The northeastern part of the Berlin S-Bahn circle line is located in Pankow, which includes the stations of Storkower Straße, Landsberger Allee, Greifswalder Straße, Prenzlauer Allee and Schönhauser Allee. Bornholmer Straße station and Wollankstraße station border the borough of Mitte, while Schönholz station and Wilhelmsruh station border Reinickendorf. The Stettiner Bahn serves Pankow, Pankow-Heinersdorf, Blankenburg, Karow and Buch.

In addition to the S-Bahn, five U-Bahn stations are located in the borough of Pankow: Senefelderplatz, Eberswalder Straße, Schönhauser Allee, Vinetastraße and Pankow. At Schönhauser Allee and Pankow, travellers can change to S-Bahn services.

Twin towns – sister cities

Pankow is twinned with:
 Ashkelon, Israel (1994)
 Kołobrzeg, Poland (1994)

Gallery

See also

 Berlin-Pankow (electoral district)
 Berlin-Friedrichshain-Kreuzberg – Prenzlauer Berg East (electoral district)
 Karpfenteich

References

External links

Official website 
Official website of Berlin 
tic-berlin: tourist & historical information about Pankow district

 
Districts of Berlin
Former boroughs of Berlin